Patrick Alexander "Pat" Gomez (born March 17, 1968) is an American former Major League Baseball pitcher. Gomez played for the San Diego Padres in 1993 and the San Francisco Giants from 1994 to 1995. He batted and threw left-handed. Gomez attended San Juan High School and was by the Chicago Cubs in the fourth round of the 1986 Major League Baseball draft.

References

External links

1968 births
Living people
Baseball players from California
San Diego Padres players
San Francisco Giants players
Sportspeople from Roseville, California
Charleston Wheelers players
Charlotte Knights players
Greenville Braves players
Peoria Chiefs players
Phoenix Firebirds players
Richmond Braves players
San Jose Giants players
Winston-Salem Spirits players
Wytheville Cubs players